Gil Junger (born November 7, 1954) is an American director, most famous for 10 Things I Hate About You, his directorial film debut.  He is a 1972 graduate of the Trinity-Pawling School in Pawling, New York.

Filmography

Film
 10 Things I Hate About You (1999)
 Black Knight (2001)
 If Only (2004)
 10 Things I Hate About Life (2014) (Cancelled)
 Think Like a Dog (2020)

TV movies
 Being Dunbar (1999)
 Earthquake (2004)
 Happy Campers (2008)
 My Fake Fiancé (2009)
 Beauty & the Briefcase (2010)
 Christmas Cupid (2010)
 Teen Spirit (2011)
 Rip City (2012)
 Christmas Bounty (2013)
 Santa's Little Helper (2015)

Direct-to-video
 Get Smart's Bruce and Lloyd: Out of Control (2008)

Television

The John Larroquette Show (1995)
The Jeff Foxworthy Show (1995)
The Office (1995)
Minor Adjustments (1995)
In the House (1995)
Pearl (1996)
Living Single (1996–1997)
Chicago Sons (1997)
Soul Man (1997)
Dharma & Greg (1997)
The Secret Lives of Men (1998)
The Hughleys (1998)
Zoe, Duncan, Jack and Jane (1999)
Action (1999)
Ladies Man (1999)
Odd Man Out (1999)
Daddio (2000)
Movie Stars (2000)
Inside Schwartz (2001)
Less than Perfect (2002)
The O'Keefes (2003)
Rodney (2005–2006)
Kyle XY (2006)
In Case of Emergency (2007)
Greek (2007)
Rules of Engagement (2009)
Glory Daze (2010)

References

External links

1954 births
American television directors
Living people
Film directors from New York City